Omar Islas Hernández (born 13 April 1996) is a Mexican professional footballer who plays as a forward for Liga MX club UNAM.

References

External links
 

Living people
1996 births
Association football forwards
Club Universidad Nacional footballers
Venados F.C. players
Alebrijes de Oaxaca players
Atlante F.C. footballers
Liga MX players
Ascenso MX players
Liga Premier de México players
Tercera División de México players
Footballers from the State of Mexico
People from Naucalpan
Mexican footballers